The John B. Stetson House (known locally as the Stetson Mansion), built for hat manufacturer (and inventor of the cowboy hat) John B. Stetson, is a historic home in DeLand, Florida, United States. It is located at 1031 Camphor Lane. The house was designed by popular Philadelphia architect George T. Pearson in 1886.  Pearson also designed several buildings for Mr. Stetson on the Stetson University campus, as well as the Stetson factory buildings in North Philadelphia.

On November 21, 1978, it was added to the U.S. National Register of Historic Places.

The house was extensively renovated in 2008 and, although a private residence, is open for scheduled tours.

References

External links
 Stetson Mansion
 Volusia County listings at National Register of Historic Places
 Florida's Office of Cultural and Historical Programs
 Volusia County listings 
 Great Floridians of DeLand

Houses on the National Register of Historic Places in Volusia County, Florida
Tourist attractions in Volusia County, Florida
Vernacular architecture in Florida
DeLand, Florida